Yellow tea can refer to Chinese huángchá and Korean hwangcha.

Chinese huangcha 

It is an increasingly rare and expensive variety of tea. The process for making yellow tea is similar to that of green but with an added step of encasing, or sweltering, this also gives the leaves a slightly yellow coloring during the drying process. Yellow tea is often placed in the same category with green tea due to its light oxidation. One of the primary aims of making yellow tea is to remove the characteristic grassy smell of green tea.

Varieties 
 Junshan Yinzhen (君山銀針): from Hunan Province, China is a Silver Needle yellow tea. A Chinese Famous Tea.
 Huoshan Huangya (霍山黃芽): from Mt. Huo, Anhui Province, China.
 Meng Ding Huangya (蒙頂黃芽): from Mt. Meng, Ya'an, Sichuan Province, China.
 Mogan Huangya (莫干黃芽): from Mount Mogan, Zhejiang Province, China.
 Beigang Maojian (北港毛尖): from Yueyang, Hunan Province, China. Also known by the Tang Dynasty-era name Yōnghúchá (邕湖茶).
 Weishan Maojian (溈山毛尖): from Mt. Wei, Weishan Township, Ningxiang, Hunan Province, China.
 Haimagong Cha (海馬宮茶): from Dafang County, Guizhou Province, China.
 Da Ye Qing (大葉青): from Guangdong Province, China. Literally Big Leaf Green.
 Pingyang Huangtang (平陽黃湯): from Zhejiang Province, China. Could be called one of the Wenzhou Huangtang (溫州黃湯); the latter term is literally translated as Yellow Broth or Yellow Soup.
 Yuan'an Luyuan (遠安鹿苑): from Yuan'an County, Hubei Province, China.

Korean hwangcha 

In Korean tea terminology wherein domestic tea is categorized mainly as either green tea (nokcha) or fermented tea (balhyocha) – "fermented" practically meaning "oxidized" with this term – "yellow tea" (hwangcha) is used to denote lightly oxidized balhyocha without implications of processing methods or a result that would qualify the tea as "yellow tea" in the Chinese definition. Unlike Chinese huángchá, Korean hwangcha is made similarly to oolong tea or lightly oxidized black tea, depending on who makes it – the key feature is a noticeable but otherwise relatively low level of oxidation which leaves the resulting tea liquor yellow in color.

See also

Notes

References 

 
Asian drinks
Chinese tea
Korean tea